Colonia International Airport  is a general aviation airport serving Colonia del Sacramento, capital of the Colonia Department of Uruguay.

Southeast approach and departure are over the water.

The Colonia non-directional beacon (Ident: COL) is located on the field. The

See also

Transport in Uruguay
List of airports in Uruguay

References

External links
OpenStreetMap - Laguna de Los Patos International Airport
OurAirports - Laguna de Los Patos International Airport

Airports in Uruguay
Buildings and structures in Colonia Department
Colonia del Sacramento